Giulliana Rocha de Barros Rego (born 30 July 1991), better known as Giulli Succine, is a Brazilian actress and psychologist. She began her career at the age of 11 in the theater with the play O Cinema e a Dança. Already in the television participated in programs like Rebelde, Milagres de Jesus and Sol Nascente.

Biography 
Giulliana Rocha de Barros Rego was born on 30 July 1991 in Barra da Tijuca, a neighborhood in the southern part of Rio de Janeiro. She made her debut in theater at the age of 11, in 2002, with the play O Cinema e Dança, then as protagonist the following year in A Bela e a Fera, soon after A Noviça Rebelde in 2004.

In 2010, she made her television debut in the miniseries A Vida Alheia produced by Rede Globo under the direction of Cininha de Paula. Two years later, she participated in the remake of Rebelde, a novel produced by RecordTV and directed by Ivan Zettel. In the year of 2014, she appeared in the episode of premiere of the biblical series Milagres de Jesus.

Between 2015 at 2017, she joined the stand-ins team of the series Escolinha do Professor Raimundo, adaptation of the original creation of Chico Anysio, where he worked alongside Ellen Roche. In 2016, she starred opposite the actor Bruno Gagliasso during the novel Sol Nascente, a month later reappeared in Malhação: Pro Dia Nascer Feliz, where the character Tânia lived in her youth.

After 14 years out of the theater, Giulliana returned in 2018 with the play Noite da Comédia Improvisada at Teatro Leblon in Rio de Janeiro, who stayed had a second season with the actress in September of the same year.

Personal life 
In April 2019 she took up a relationship with Daniel Lamassa through Instagram. She is a cousin of the journalist Luca Moreira.

Career

Television

Movies

Internet

Theater

Advertising Campaigns

References

External links 

 
 Giulliana Succine on AdoroCinema
 
 

1991 births
Living people
Actresses from Rio de Janeiro (city)
Brazilian television actresses
Brazilian film actresses